Megachile khamana is a species of bee in the family Megachilidae. It was described by Theodore Dru Alison Cockerell in 1938.

References

Khamana
Insects described in 1938